Zaurbek Igorevich Pliyev (born 27 September 1991) is a Russian-Ossetian football player who plays for Rodina Moscow.

Career

Club
Pliyev made his professional debut for Spartak Nalchik on 15 July 2009 in the Russian Cup game against FC Nizhny Novgorod.

In October 2014, Pliyev, along with Dmitri Khomich, Mikhail Bakayev, Aleksandr Kislitsyn and Samat Smakov, was banned from training with FC Kairat by the club.

On 7 December 2015, Pliyev signed a three-and-a-half year contract with FC Terek Grozny. 
After signing a new contract with Akhmat at the end of the 2018–19 season, Pliyev joined Dynamo Moscow on 9 June 2019, signing a three-year contract.

International
After representing Russia's U-19 team in 2009, he was called up to the Kazakhstan U-21 squad in 2011. In August 2012, he was called up to the Russia U-21 squad.

Career statistics

Personal life
His younger brother Konstantin Pliyev is also a football player.

References

External links
 

1991 births
Ossetian footballers
Sportspeople from Vladikavkaz
Living people
Russian footballers
Russia youth international footballers
Russia under-21 international footballers
Association football defenders
PFC Spartak Nalchik players
FC Astana players
FC Spartak Vladikavkaz players
FC Kairat players
FC Akhmat Grozny players
FC Dynamo Moscow players
FC Ufa players
Russian Premier League players
Russian First League players
Kazakhstan Premier League players
Russian expatriate footballers
Expatriate footballers in Kazakhstan
Russian expatriate sportspeople in Kazakhstan